Find It on the Wings is the fifteenth studio album by Christian singer Sandy Patty, released in late 1994 on Word Records. It is the first album on which the singer uses her real last name Patty, and she continued to use it on future releases. Patty collaborated with producer Phil Ramone and songwriters Burt Bacharach and Will Jennings on the song "If I Want To", while her long-time producer Greg Nelson produced the rest of the album. Patty also duetted with R&B singer Peabo Bryson on the gospel track "Make It 'til Tomorrow". Bob Farrell co-wrote the majority of the songs with producer Nelson. Cindy Morgan contributed the song "When I Heal". In 1995, Patty was nominated for Female Vocalist of the Year at the 26th GMA Dove Awards, losing to CeCe Winans, but the album did win Inspirational Album of the Year. In 1996, Find It on the Wings was nominated for a Grammy for Best Pop/Contemporary Gospel Album at the 38th Grammy Awards. The album peaked at number three on the Billboard Top Christian Albums chart.

Track listing 

Note: "If I Want To" was produced by Phil Ramone. All other tracks were produced by Greg Nelson.

Personnel 
 Sandi Patty – vocals, concept (6)
 Tommy Sims – programming (1, 3), arrangements (1, 3), bass (8, 10)
 Danny Duncan – programming assistant (1, 3), additional arrangements (1, 3)
 David Hamilton – programming (2), orchestrations and conductor (2), additional synthesizers (3), acoustic piano (10)
 Phil Naish – additional synthesizers (2, 3, 5, 8)
 Michael Omartian – programming (4), orchestrations and conductor (4)
 Robbie Buchanan – programming (5), arrangements (5)
 Blair Masters – programming (6), arrangements (6)
 Rob Mounsey – keyboard programming (7), arrangements (7)
 Shane Keister – keyboards (8), additional synthesizers (10)
 Alan Pasqua – keyboards (8), additional synthesizers (10)
 Randy Kerber – acoustic piano (11)
 Dann Huff – guitars (2, 4, 5, 10), programming (9), arrangements (9)
 Gary Lunn – bass (2, 4)
 Paul Leim – drums (2, 8)
 David Huff – additional drum programming (9)
 Mark Hammond – drums (10)
 Farrell Morris – percussion (4)
 Jeff Porcaro – percussion (11)
 Andy Snitzer – tenor saxophone (7)
 Nashville String Machine – strings (2, 4, 5, 11)
 Ronn Huff – orchestrations (5)
 Jeremy Lubbock – string arrangements (11)
 Mervyn Warren – BGV arrangements (1), choir arrangements (3)
 Bob Bailey – backing vocals (1), choir (3)
 Kim Fleming – backing vocals (1), choir (3)
 Vicki Hampton – backing vocals (1), choir (3)
 Yvonne Hodges – backing vocals (1), choir (3)
 Skyler Jett – backing vocals (1), choir (3)
 Donna McElroy – backing vocals (1), choir (3)
 Angela Primm – backing vocals (1), choir (3)
 Duawne Starling – backing vocals (1), choir (3)
 Chris Willis – backing vocals (1), choir (3)
 The Kid Connection – choir (1)
 Bob Carlisle – backing vocals (2)
 Chris Eaton – backing vocals (2, 6, 8, 9)
 Mark Ivey – backing vocals (2)
 Peabo Bryson – vocals (3)
 Chris Rodriguez – backing vocals (6)

Production
 Matt Baugher – executive producer 
 Sandi Patty – executive producer (7)
 Jeff Balding – engineer (1-6, 8-11)
 Steve Bishir – engineer (1-6, 8-11)
 Terry Christianson – engineer (1-6, 8-11)
 Bob Clark – engineer (1-6, 8-11)
 Tommy Cooper – engineer (1-6, 8-11)
 Bill Deaton – engineer (1-6, 8-11), mixing (1-6, 8-11)
 Brent King – engineer (1-6, 8-11)
 Frank Wolf – engineer (1-6, 8-11)
 Jeff Aebi – second engineer (1-6, 8-11)
 Blake Eiseman – second engineer (1-6, 8-11)
 Joey Grimstead – second engineer (1-6, 8-11)
 Scott Link – second engineer (1-6, 8-11)
 Shawn McLean – second engineer (1-6, 8-11)
 Wayne Mehl – second engineer (1-6, 8-11)
 Ray Mendez – second engineer (1-6, 8-11)
 Michael Moore – second engineer (1-6, 8-11)
 David Murphy – second engineer (1-6, 8-11)
 Brett Perry – second engineer (1-6, 8-11)
 Carry Summers – second engineer (1-6, 8-11), mix assistant (1-6, 8-11)
 Aaron Swihart – second engineer (1-6, 8-11)
 Shane D. Wilson – second engineer (1-6, 8-11)
 Martin Woodlee – second engineer (1-6, 8-11)
 Pete Martinez – mix assistant (1-6, 8-11)
 Richard Alderson – engineer (7)
 John Patterson – mixing (7)
 Phil Ramone – mixing (7)
 Eric Schilling – mixing (7)
 Jay Militscher – mix assistant (7)
 Jen Monnar – mix assistant (7)
 Hank Williams – editing at MasterMix (Nashville, Tennessee) (2)
 Doug Sax – mastering at The Mastering Lab (Hollywood, California) (1-6, 8-11)
 Holly Krig-Smith – production coordinator (1-6, 8-11)
 Jill Dell'Abate – production coordinator (7)
 Benji Cowart – additional production assistant (1-6, 8-11)
 Jacob Wang – additional production assistant (1-6, 8-11)
 Loren Balman – art direction 
 Karrine Caulkins – design 
 Buddy Jackson – design 
 Neill Whitlock – photography

Charts

Radio singles

Accolades
GMA Dove Awards

References

1994 albums
Sandi Patty albums
Word Records albums